There were five independent candidates in the 1969 Manitoba provincial election.  One independent candidate, Gordon Beard, was elected to the Legislative Assembly of Manitoba for the northern electoral division of Churchill.  Information about other candidates (including independent candidates who ran in by-elections between 1969 and 1973) may be found on this page.

By-election candidates

St. Vital, 5 April 1971: Samuel Bordman

Samuel Bordman was a wireless operator with the Department of Transport, and a frequent candidate for public office in Winnipeg in the 1960s and early 1970s.  He was a longtime supporter of a referendum on the Metropolitan Corporation of Greater Winnipeg.

References

Independent candidates in Manitoba provincial elections